Diffraction-limited storage rings (DLSR), or ultra-low emittance storage rings, are synchrotron light sources where the emittance of the electron-beam in the storage ring is smaller or comparable to the emittance of the x-ray photon beam they produce at the end of their insertion devices.
These facilities operate in the soft to hard x-ray range (100eV—100keV) with extremely high brilliance (in the order of 1021—1022 photons/s/mm2/mrad2/0.1%BW)

Together with X-ray free-electron lasers, they constitute the fourth generation of light sources, characterized by a relatively high coherent flux (in the order of 1014—1015photons/s/0.1%BW for DLSR) and enable extended physical and chemical characterizations at the nano-scale.

Existing diffraction-limited storage rings 
MAX IV Laboratory, in Lund, Sweden.
Sirius, in Campinas, Brazil
European Synchrotron Radiation Facility, Extremely Brilliant Source (ESRF-EBS), in Grenoble, France

DLSR upgrade or facilities under construction 
Advanced Photon Source Upgrade (APS-U), in Argonne, Illinois, USA

Planned or projected DLSR upgrades or new facilities 
PETRA IV, Upgrade (PETRA IV), at DESY, Hamburg, Germany
Advanced Light Source, Upgrade (ALS-U), in Berkeley, California, USA
Swiss Light Source 2, Upgrade (SLS-2), in Viligen, Switzerland
Diamond II (Diamond II), in Didcot, Oxfordshire, UK
ELETTRA 2.0 (Elettra 2.0), in Trieste, Italy
High Energy Photon Source (HEPS), in Beijing, China
 ALBA II, in Barcelona, Spain

See also
X-Ray Free Electron Lasers

References 

X-rays
Photons
Accelerator physics